The South African national cricket team was meant to tour Australia over the 1971–72 Australian summer. 

However, the tour was cancelled after protests from the anti-apartheid movement; in making this decision, the Australian Cricket Board had been influenced by the protests that accompanied the 1971 South Africa rugby union tour of Australia.

South Africa's selected squad was:
Batsmen – Ali Bacher (capt), Hylton Ackerman, Lee Irvine, Graeme Pollock, Barry Richards 
All rounders – Eddie Barlow, Dassie Biggs, Peter de Vaal, Mike Procter, Clive Rice
Fast bowlers – Peter Pollock, Pat Trimborn, Vince van der Bijl
Spin bowlers – Grahame Chevalier 
Wicketkeeper – Denis Lindsay 
Barlow subsequently withdrew for business reasons and was replaced by Arthur Short.

The tour was replaced by a tour from a Rest of the World XI, which included the Pollock brothers and Ackerman.

As a result of the tour's cancellation, South Africa's exclusion from international cricket was formalised. South Africa would not tour Australia again until the 1992 Cricket World Cup, and would not make another full tour until 1993-94.

References

Further reading
 Bruce Murray and Christopher Merrett, Caught Behind: Race and Politics in Springbok Cricket, Wits University Press and University of KwaZulu-Natal Press, Johannesburg and Scottsville, 2004, pp. 146–58

South African cricket seasons from 1970–71 to 1999–2000
Cricket and apartheid